Charles Delafaye (1677 – 11 December 1762) was Member of the Parliament of Ireland for Belturbet from 1715 to 1727 and Chief Secretary to the Earl of Galway and the Duke of Grafton who held joint Governorship.  Delafaye shared his that role with Martin Bladen.

He was elected a Fellow of the Royal Society in 1725. He was appointed a Clerk of the Signet from 1728 to 1747.

He died in 1762 at the age of 85 at his home in Wichbury, near Salisbury.

References

1677 births
1762 deaths
Chief Secretaries for Ireland
Irish MPs 1715–1727
Members of the Privy Council of Ireland
Fellows of the Royal Society
Members of the Parliament of Ireland (pre-1801) for County Cavan constituencies
Freemasons of the Premier Grand Lodge of England